Girdler is a surname of professional origin. Girdlers or belt makers were people who made metal belts worn around the waist and other small metal objects. It may refer to:

People with the surname Girdler
Chris Girdler, American politician in Kentucky
Eddie Girdler, American politician and mayor of Somerset, Kentucky
Nick Girdler, freelance radio broadcaster who worked for BBC Radio Solent for 35 years from 1972 to 2006
Rick Girdler, American politician in Kentucky
Ryan Girdler (born 1972), Australian former rugby league footballer of the 1990s and 2000s
William Girdler (1947–1978), American filmmaker

People with the given name Girdler
George Girdler Smith, American engraver in 19th-century Boston

Other uses
Girdler, Kentucky
Girdler Island

See also
Girdler sulfide process, industrial production method for making heavy water (deuterium oxide)
Worshipful Company of Girdlers, a Livery Company of the City of London

References